Physopyxis cristata is a species of thorny catfish endemic to Brazil where it is found in the Rio Negro basin.  This species grows to a length of  SL.  This species prefers to live amongst submerged leaf litter.

References 
 

Doradidae
Fish of South America
Fish of Brazil
Endemic fauna of Brazil
Fish described in 2005